Ezekiel Bala (born 8 April 1987) is a Nigerian former professional footballer who played as a striker.

Career
He made his debut for Lyn in a cup match against Klemetsrud IL, on 11 May 2005, and scored 2 goals in a total of 23 league games for the club. His previous club was J.C Raiders in Jos, Nigeria.

He joined Bryne in 2008 from Lyn, later Randaberg, Nybergsund, Funnefoss/Vormsund and Ålgård.

International career
Bala was the captain of Nigeria's team in the 2007 FIFA U-20 World Cup in Canada, where he scored both goals in the win over Scotland.

References

External links
Profile at lyn.no 
Profile at lynfotball.net 
Ezekiel Bala til Bryne 21 January 2008 

1987 births
Living people
Nigerian footballers
Nigeria under-20 international footballers
Pepsi Football Academy players
Expatriate footballers in Norway
Nigerian expatriate footballers
Nigerian expatriate sportspeople in Norway
Lyn Fotball players
Eliteserien players
Norwegian First Division players
Bryne FK players
Randaberg IL players
Nybergsund IL players
Ålgård FK players
Sportspeople from Jos
Association football forwards